The second series of Warsaw Shore, a Polish television programme based in Warsaw, began airing on 20 April 2014 on MTV at Easter. The series concluded on 13 July 2014 after 13 episodes. The series was confirmed on 10 February 2014. This was the first series to feature new cast members Jakub Henke, Alan Kwieciński, Alicja Herodzińska and Malwina Pycka. This was the final series featuring Paweł Trybała and Eliza Wesołowska, who appeared only on the first episode of Series 2 due to Eliza's pregnancy.

Cast
Alan Kwieciński 
Alicja Herodzińska 
Anna Ryśnik
Eliza Wesołowska 
Ewelina Kubiak
Jakub Henke
Malwina Pycka 
Anna "Mała" Aleksandrzak
Paweł Cattaneo
Paweł "Trybson" Trybała 
Wojciech Gola

Duration of cast

Notes 

 Key:  = "Cast member" is featured in this episode.
 Key:  = "Cast member" arrives in the house.
 Key:  = "Cast member" voluntarily leaves the house.
 Key:  = "Cast member" returns to the house.
 Key:  = "Cast member" features in this episode, but is outside of the house.
 Key:  = "Cast member" leaves the series.
 Key:  = "Cast member" is not a cast member in this episode.

Episodes

References 

2014 Polish television seasons
Series 2